Kavalactones are a class of lactone compounds found in kava roots and Alpinia zerumbet (Shell ginger). Kavalactones are under research for potential to have various psychotropic effects, including anxiolytic and sedative/hypnotic activities.

Enzyme inhibition
Kava extract has been shown in vitro to potentially inhibit a wide range of hepatic enzymes, suggesting a possible potential for interactions with many pharmaceuticals and herbal medications. In human volunteers in vivo inhibition is currently limited to CYP1A2, and CYP2E1 through use of probe drugs to measure inhibition.

Research 
Several preliminary studies are assessing potential effects of kava, including its anxiolytic actions and hepatotoxicity, but the role specifically of kavalactones among many other kava compounds for these effects remains under study.

The major kavalactones (except for desmethoxyyangonin) have been shown to potentiate the activity of GABAA receptors, which may underlie the anxiolytic and sedative properties of kava. Further, inhibition of the reuptake of norepinephrine and dopamine, binding to the CB1 receptor, inhibition of voltage-gated sodium and calcium channels, and monoamine oxidase B reversible inhibition are additional pharmacological actions that have been reported for kavalactones.

Kavalactone type compounds may help protect against high glucose induced cell damage.

Toxicity
Several kavalactones (e.g. methysticin and yangonin) affect a group of enzymes involved in metabolism, called CYP1A1. Hepatotoxicity occurred in a small portion of previously healthy kava users, particularly from extracts, as opposed to whole root powders.

Compounds 

At least 18 different kavalactones have been identified to date, with methysticin being the first identified.
Multiple analogues, such as ethysticin, have also been isolated.
Some consist of a substituted α-pyrone as the lactone while others are partially saturated.

The average elimination half-life of kavalactones typically present in kava root is 9 hr.

Biosynthesis
The kavalactone biosynthetic pathway in Piper methysticum was described in 2019.

See also
 Pipermethystine

References

External links
 
The great kava boom: how Fiji's beloved psychoactive brew is going global The Guardian, 2020

Monoamine oxidase inhibitors
 
GABAA receptor positive allosteric modulators
Anxiolytics
Analgesics
Sedatives
Anticonvulsants
Nootropics